The International Festival of Peace Poetry is an international festival held biannually in Iran. The first Peace Poetry Festival was held in Tehran on May 16, 2007, with poets from sixteen countries participating, and the second Festival was held on May 16, 2009.

Peace Poetry Festival is the brainchild of Ms Rira Abbasi, Iranian author and poet. The organization of the Festival is supported solely by the donations of individuals and sponsorships of non-governmental organizations and relies on no state subsidy. The charter of the festival states that:<ref>Call for Peace Poetry, Peace Poetry Festival, ibid.</ref> "Poetry for peace is affiliated to humanity, regardless of race, religion, sex and geography."

See also
 Peace
 Peace & Freedom Magazine
 Peace and Conflict Studies

Notes and references

External links
 International Festival of Peace Poetry website
 Festival website 
 2008 Call for Peace Poetry: (English), (Persian).
 Iranian institute calls world literati for peace poetry festival, Tehran Times'', May 8, 2008.

Recurring events established in 2007
May events
Poetry festivals in Iran
Iranian poetry
Events in Tehran
Spring (season) events in Iran